The OFAB-100-120 is a small bomb can be carried on Sukhoi Su-17, Sukhoi Su-25, MiG-29, Su-27, Sukhoi Su-30 and various other aircraft.

Purpose
This bomb is designed to engage lightly armored materiel and military industrial facilities, as well as manpower. It is dropped from altitudes of 500 to 15,000 m at a speed of 500 to 1,150 km/h. This aircraft bomb is effective against personnel in open terrain and motorized infantry at the reserves concentration base either on the march or in battle array. It is filled with fragments and powerful explosive compositions based on TNT/RDX. The design of this aircraft bomb provides for better fragments distribution in the fragments flight area and high density of the fragmentation zone within the lethal range as compared to general-purpose munitions. Aircraft can carry this bomb with a single-point suspension bomb rack or on 14” NATO standard suspension systems, using the corresponding fuze type.

Technical characteristics
Caliber, 100 kg
Length, 1065mm
Body Diameter, ø273mm
Tail fin span,  345mm
Characteristic time, s	21,10/6
Suspension	 Single/250 mm/14"
Explosive weight, 42 kg
Number of balls	 15 000/6 900
Ball diameter, mm	ø8,75/ø11,9
Bomb weight, 123 kg
Fuze	AVU-ETM; AVU-ET; AVU; AMV-AE2; 2'-12UN-2B; 3,5-12UN-2B

References

Cold War aerial bombs of the Soviet Union
Aerial bombs of Russia